The .500 S&W Magnum or 12.7×41mmSR is a .50 caliber semi-rimmed revolver cartridge developed by Cor-Bon in partnership with the Smith & Wesson "X-Gun" engineering team for use in the Smith & Wesson Model 500 X-frame revolver and introduced in February 2003 at the SHOT Show. From its inception, it was intended to be the most powerful handgun cartridge to date, with the capacity to harvest all North American game species. While more powerful handgun cartridges, such as the .500 Bushwhacker, have emerged since, they are only available in custom firearms, and the .500 S&W remains the most powerful production handgun cartridge.

Cartridge history
Smith & Wesson had been at the forefront of the development of powerful handgun cartridges such as the .357 S&W Magnum and the .44 Remington Magnum. However, since 1960, the company's .44 Magnum, which it had developed in partnership with Remington, was eclipsed by the .454 Casull. Since then, several other more powerful cartridges have been developed by Action Arms, Linebaugh, Ruger, Wildey, and Winchester for repeating handguns.

In 1971, Smith & Wesson experienced a dramatic surge in orders for their Model 29 revolver in the .44 Magnum chambering. As S&W production was not able to keep up with demand, available Model 29 revolvers were being sold for two to three times the suggested retail price. This surge in interest was largely due to the 1971 film Dirty Harry, where the Model 29 revolver was billed as the most powerful revolver (The .454 Casull, designed in 1955, was not in commercial production until 1997). With the introduction of the .500 S&W Magnum and the Model 500 revolver, Smith & Wesson recaptured the title of "most powerful handgun", which once again proved beneficial for the company's sales.

The .500 Smith & Wesson Magnum was designed from the outset to be the most powerful production handgun cartridge. S&W product manager, Herb Belin, proposed the idea of developing the revolver and cartridge to the S&W sales team. With the backing of the sales team, the project was approved by S&W president Bob Scott. The ammunition was developed by Cor-Bon and Peter Pi in partnership with the S&W X-Gun engineering team of Brett Curry, Rich Mikuta, and Tom Oakley. Eleven months later, on 9 January 2003, the team unveiled the Smith & Wesson Model 500 revolver and the .500 S&W Magnum cartridge. According to Belin, the cartridge was designed from its inception to be substantially more powerful than any other prior production handgun cartridge. Cor-Bon later developed the .500 S&W Special cartridge to offer a more moderate level of power from firearms chambered in the .500 S&W.

Cartridge design and specifications
The .500 S&W Magnum is a semi-rimmed, cylindrical cartridge optimized for use in revolvers. The cartridge is designed to headspace on its rim. However, unlike the .44 Magnum and other rimmed cartridges designed for use in revolvers, the .500 S&W cartridge is semi-rimmed, and can accordingly be cycled more smoothly and more reliably in tubular magazines. However, the cartridge does not cycle well through box magazines. The rim tends to lock in the extractor groove.

The .500 S&W Magnum was designed to fire a bullet with a diameter (⌀) of  unlike the .500 Linebaugh, which fires a 0.510 in (12.9 mm) bullet. This was done so as not to run afoul of the National Firearms Act and be considered a destructive device as had happened to Whildin's .50 AE cartridge, which at first was designed to fire a 0.510 in (12.9 mm) but had to be redesigned to fire a  instead.

SAAMI compliant .500 S&W Magnum cartridge schematic: All dimensions in inches (millimeters).

The cylinders of the S&W Model 500 revolver are engineered to be capable of withstanding 50% over pressure. Regular proof-load testing is performed at 20% over pressure.

This is because the cylinders of the revolvers are too short to accommodate such cartridges. The now-discontinued Taurus Raging Bull 500 is an example of one such revolver. It has a cylinder which is about  shorter than that of the S&W Model 500.

Performance

The .500 S&W Magnum is considered the most powerful commercial sporting handgun cartridge by virtue of the muzzle energy it can generate. These bullets are often seated as far out as possible to take advantage of the complete cylinder length, so as to maximize the powder capacity which the case can provide. Ammunition loaded to this cartridge length (2.25"-2.3") is capable of achieving approximately 200 feet per second higher velocities than most standard length loadings (2"-2.1") without exceeding SAAMI specified operating pressures, albeit at the cost of increased recoil. The +L loadings of TII Armory present an example of factory ammunition loaded to this level.

It is claimed to be the most potent commercially available handgun cartridge on the market and provides power similar to long-established wildcat cartridges such as the .375 JDJ (J. D. Jones) and pistol loadings of the .45-70 Government. Indeed, some rounds use bullets weighing almost 1 oz. (28 g ~ 440 gr.), which are propelled at about  – essentially the same performance of a 12 gauge shotgun slug.

Bullet weights available for this cartridge range from a  jacketed hollow point to a  hardcast lead bullet. The heaviest bullet, produced by Tazza Bullets in Queensland, Australia, is a hardcast lead bullet weighing 740 grains, about the same as a common .50 BMG projectile.

 Low recoil or reduced recoil ammunition is manufactured by the Grizzly Cartridge Company and Winchester. This is achieved by lowering the velocity and mass of the projectile.

Cor-Bon introduced the .500 S&W Special in 2004 as a lower energy and lower recoiling alternative to the .500 S&W Magnum cartridge. These low-recoiling alternatives to the full-power .500 S&W Magnum significantly reduce felt recoil, which is especially noticeable in the shorter  handguns. The cartridge is available from several manufacturers.

The .500 S&W Magnum has very high recoil energy and recoil velocity. The high energy and velocity of the recoil produce significant muzzle rise in revolvers so chambered. Smith & Wesson incorporated design features to help mitigate both the perceived and actual recoil of their Model 500 revolver. The revolver is equipped with a compensator and Hogue Sorbothane grips. The revolver's considerable weight of  plays a substantial role in moderating the recoil of the cartridge. Aftermarket offerings exist to mount a rifle-style muzzle brake to the S&W Model 500, further decreasing recoil.

A double-discharge effect is sometimes observed with the cartridge. The heavy recoil causes some shooters to inadvertently squeeze the trigger as a reflexive action to hold on to the revolver soon after the discharge of the previous round. Furthermore, some shooters have experienced the cylinder unlocking and rotating after the firing of cartridge, which is a partial manifestation of the same phenomenon.

Sporting applications

The .500 S&W Magnum was originally designed to be primarily a handgun hunting cartridge. The creation of Big Horn Armory's Model 89 lever action rifle has changed it to a serious big game hunting rifle cartridge. In that platform, the cartridge is capable of taking any animal on earth. It also serves a secondary purpose as a back-up survival handgun cartridge as a defense against the large bears of North America.

The .500 S&W Magnum's success with large, dangerous game is in part due to the availability of heavier bullets with exceptional sectional densities.  Bullets above  have the sectional densities required for hunting heavier African dangerous game.  As a hunting cartridge the .500 S&W Magnum has been found to be effective against elephant and African buffalo as long as ranges are kept within reasonable limits. Bullet selection is extremely important when hunting thick-skinned dangerous game.  Smith & Wesson bills the Model 500 revolver as "A Hunting Handgun For Any Game Animal Walking". Big Horn Armory bills its Model 89 rifle as the most powerful lever action rifle currently made.

In North America, it serves the purpose of hunting all North American big game species. The cartridge has had success in taking Alaskan brown bear, American bison, moose, and elk. It is also used to hunt black bear, whitetail deer, wild boar, and feral hogs. The cartridge gained some notoriety as being the cartridge which was used to hunt the supposed Monster Pig.

Bullets ranging from  can be used for light CXP2 game species. Bullets over  can be used for dangerous game. Hornady's 500 gr. SP load is rated for CXP4 class dangerous game by Hornady out to  against dangerous game, based on Hornady Index of Terminal Standards (H.I.T.S.) calculations.

The .500 S&W Magnum is available in firearms more convenient to carry than a full-sized rifle. This lends to its use as a defensive carry firearm in areas where dangerous predatory species may be encountered. Big Horn Armory's Model 89 carbine is a 37" long rifle suitable for close quarter use in heavily wooded areas or where brush may predominate. This lever action rifle is often carried in Alaska for defense against bears. The .500 S&W Magnum cartridge has found use in survival guns such as the NEF Handi Rifle and the S&W Survival Kit. Smith & Wesson manufactured a  version of the Model 500 revolver (model 500ES, whose production ended in December 2009), which was included in the S&W Survival Kit. This shorter-barreled revolver is handier, weighing , and has no compensator, which comes standard with the more common S&W 500 revolvers, such as the  model.

Firearms and ammunition
Currently there are several .50 caliber handguns which are capable of firing the .500 S&W Magnum. These types of revolvers normally have five rounds to allow for thicker cylinder walls to accommodate the pressure generated by the large and powerful cartridge. Big Horn Armory's Model 89 carbine and rifle are currently the only repeating long guns chambered in this cartridge. The Model 89's long barrels significantly increase bullet velocity and energy. The single shot Thompson-Center Encore, NEF Handi Rifle, and Towner pump rifle are also chambered for this round. Magnum Research manufacturers the single action Big Frame Revolver for the .500 S&W Magnum with barrel lengths up to 10". Due to the longer cylinders and tighter tolerances typical of these handguns, many shooters have observed higher velocities with the BFR than from the S&W Model 500 while employing the same loadings. 

Ammunition for the .500 S&W Magnum is available from many mainstream ammunition manufacturers. Recently many of these manufacturers have expanded their .500 S&W offerings, which speaks to the popularity of the cartridge.
{| class="wikitable" border="1"
|+ .500 S&W Magnum ammunition
|-
| style="background: #eeeeee" width="220pt" | Ammunition 
| style="background: #eeeeee" width="180pt" | Bullet
| style="background: #eeeeee" width="140pt" | Muzzle velocity 8/ 18 in barrel
| style="background: #eeeeee" width="140pt" | Muzzle energy 8/ 18 in barrel
|-
| style="background: #eeeeee" | Buffalo Bore 18A ||  LFN || /  || / 
|-
| style="background: #eeeeee" | Buffalo Bore 18B ||  JFN || /  || / 
|-
| style="background: #eeeeee" | Buffalo Bore 18C ||  LFN || /  || / 
|-
| style="background: #eeeeee" | Cor-Bon HT500SW275-12 ||  Hunter DPX || / || / 
|-
| style="background: #eeeeee" | Cor-Bon HT500SW325-12 ||  Hunter DPX || / || /
|-
| style="background: #eeeeee" | Cor-Bon HT500SW350-12 ||  Hunter JHP || / || /
|-
| style="background: #eeeeee" | Cor-Bon HT500SW385-12 ||  Hunter BC || / || /
|-
| style="background: #eeeeee" | Cor-Bon HT500SW400SP-12 ||  Hunter SP || / || /
|-
| style="background: #eeeeee" | Cor-Bon HT500SW440HC-12 ||  Hunter HC || / || / 
|-
| style="background: #eeeeee" | Cor-Bon HT500SW500HC-12 ||  Hunter HC || /  || / 
|-
| style="background: #eeeeee" | Federal P500XB1 ||  Barnes XPB || / || / 
|-
| style="background: #eeeeee" | Federal P500SA ||  Swift AF || / || /
|-
| style="background: #eeeeee" | Hornady 9249 ||  FTX || / || / 
|-
| style="background: #eeeeee" | Hornady 9250 ||  XTP MAG || / || / 
|-
| style="background: #eeeeee" | Hornady 9252 ||  FP XTP || / || / 
|-
| style="background: #eeeeee" | MagTech 500C ||  SCHP || / || / 
|-
| style="background: #eeeeee" | MagTech 500L ||  SJSP || / || / 
|-
| style="background: #eeeeee" | MagTech 500B ||  SJSP || / || / 
|-
| style="background: #eeeeee" | MagTech 500A ||  SJSP || / || / 
|-
| style="background: #eeeeee" | Underwood Ammo 500 S&W 348 ||  JHP || / || / 
|-
| style="background: #eeeeee" | Underwood Ammo 500 S&W 839 Xtreme Penetrator ||  copper || / || / 
|-
| style="background: #eeeeee" | Underwood Ammo 500 S&W 347 Xtreme Penetrator ||  copper || / || /
|-
| style="background: #eeeeee" | Underwood Ammo 500 S&W 749 ||  WFNGC || / || / 
|-
| style="background: #eeeeee" | Underwood Ammo 500 S&W 744 ||  WFNGC || / || / 
|-
| style="background: #eeeeee" | Underwood Ammo 500 S&W 741 ||  WFNGC || / || / 
|-
| style="background: #eeeeee" | Winchester X500SW ||  JHP || / || / 
|-
| style="background: #eeeeee" | Winchester S500SWDB ||  Dual Bond || / || /
|-
| style="background: #eeeeee" | Winchester S500PTHP ||  PTHP || / || / 
|-
|colspan="4" align="center" | Values courtesy of the respective ammunition manufacturer
|}

In addition to these manufacturers, smaller manufacturers such as Double Tap Ammunition and Magtech Ammunition offer ammunition for firearms chambered for this cartridge.

See also
 12 mm caliber
 List of handgun cartridges
 Table of handgun and rifle cartridges

Footnotes

References 

 "Handgun Hunter Magazine – 50-caliber shootout " by Gary Smith
 "Reloading the 500 S&W Magnum " at ReloadAmmo.com
 "Smith & Wesson’s New .500 Magnum Revolver" by Jeff Quinn at GunBlast.com
 ".500 S&W Magnum Loading Data"  Extensive reloading data by John Ross, author of Unintended Consequences
 " These five handguns shoot with .500 Smith and Wesson Magnum cartridge" by Boyko Nikolov at BulgarianMilitary.com

External links 

 Smith & Wesson
 Magnum Research Revolvers
 C.I.P. TDCC sheet 500 S&W Mag

Pistol and rifle cartridges
Magnum pistol cartridges
Cor-Bon cartridges
Smith & Wesson cartridges
Weapons and ammunition introduced in 2003